Spain competed at the 1988 Winter Olympics in Calgary, Alberta, Canada.

Competitors
The following is the list of number of competitors in the Games.

Alpine skiing

Men

Women

Cross-country skiing

Men

C = Classical style, F = Freestyle

Women

C = Classical style, F = Freestyle

Figure skating

Women

Luge

Men

Ski jumping

References 

 Official Olympic Reports
 Olympic Winter Games 1988, full results by sports-reference.com

Nations at the 1988 Winter Olympics
1988
Olympics